Marcos Daniel Riquelme (born 18 February 1988) is an Argentine footballer that currently plays for Bolivian club Club Always Ready.

References
 
 

1989 births
Living people
Argentine footballers
Argentine expatriate footballers
Club Atlético Fénix players
Olimpo footballers
Club Bolívar players
Club Deportivo Palestino footballers
Audax Italiano footballers
Universidad de Chile footballers
Chilean Primera División players
Bolivian Primera División players
Expatriate footballers in Chile
Expatriate footballers in Bolivia
Association football forwards
Footballers from Buenos Aires